The Holocaust in American Life is a book by historian Peter Novick published in 1999. His subject is not the Holocaust, but rather how it has been acknowledged, defined, and spread as an event which requires public remembrance.  It has been reviewed by major journals and discussed in many Jewish magazines.  The book popularized the term "victimization Olympics" to describe how various groups have fought to portray themselves as the most serious victims of the Holocaust.

In the acknowledgement section of The Holocaust Industry, published in 2000, author Norman G. Finkelstein writes:
The initial stimulus for [The Holocaust Industry] was Peter Novick's seminal study, The Holocaust in American Life, which I reviewed for a British literary journal.

Hasia Diner has accused Novick and  Finkelstein of being "harsh critics of American Jewry from the left", and challenges the notion reflected in their books that American Jews did not begin to commemorate the Holocaust until post 1967.

In the UK the book was published under the alternative title The Holocaust and collective memory: the American experience (Bloomsbury, 1999)

References

Further reading
 Norman G. Finkelstein (2000), The Holocaust Industry, Verso Books,

External links
 
 Book Discussion on Holocaust in American Life with Peter Novick, June 17, 1999

Holocaust historiography
1999 non-fiction books
The Holocaust and the United States